USS Rose Mary (SP-1216) was a United States Navy patrol vessel in commission from 1917 to 1918.

Rose Mary was built in 1917 as a private motorboat of the same name by the Great Lakes Boat Building Company at Milwaukee, Wisconsin. On 8 September 1917, the U.S. Navy acquired her from her owner, Robert E. Hackett of Milwaukee, for use as a section patrol vessel during World War I. She was commissioned as USS Rose Mary (SP-1216).

Rose Mary served on patrol duties on the Great Lakes through the end of World War I. The Navy returned her to Hackett on 15 November 1918.

References

Department of the Navy Naval History and Heritage Command Online Library of Selected Images: U.S. Navy Ships -- Listed by Hull Number: "SP" #s and "ID" #s -- World War I Era Patrol Vessels and other Acquired Ships and Craft numbered from SP-1200 through SP-1299
NavSource Online: Section Patrol Craft Photo Archive: Rose Mary (SP 1216)

Patrol vessels of the United States Navy
World War I patrol vessels of the United States
Ships built in Milwaukee
1917 ships
Great Lakes ships